A page-turner is a person employed to turn sheet music pages for a soloist or accompanist, often a pianist, usually during a performance.

While some music is arranged so that the pages end at places where the musician can spare one hand to turn them, this is not always possible. A page-turner is often necessary for musicians who are playing complex pieces and prefer not to play from memory. A page-turner needs to be able to understand the musician's signals and follow the music to know when to turn the page, and to do so quickly and unobtrusively. Page-turners are sometimes acquaintances of the performer or members of the accompanying orchestra doing a favour. Professional page-turners are often freelance casual workers, not associated with any given concert hall or orchestra.

Mechanical page-turners are also available, sometimes controlled by the musician via a foot pedal. Charles Hallé is said to have invented the automatic page-turner. Foot pedals to turn pages are also available for music displayed on computers.

See also
 The Page Turner

References

Occupations in music
Sheet music